Fodoa Community Day Senior High School also known as FOSEC  is a public senior high school located in Kwahu West Municipal, in the Eastern Region of Ghana. Fodoa Community Day Senior High School was commissioned on Wednesday, 26 October 2016. The school has been in existence for nearly seven years now. Since its inception, the school has been a purely day school and single track with no boarding facilities. However, there are private hostel facility that accommodates most of the students of the school: one boys' hotel and one girls' hostel. The school is located along the Kumasi-Accra high way about 34 km from Nkawkaw. The school is one of the centers for BECE in the Kwahu West Municipal

History 
In September 2014, the Municipal Chief Executive for Kwahu west municipality Hon Dr. Alex Obeng Somuah together with the District Chief Executive for Kwahu East district Hon Nana Antwi and some other executives cut sod for the project to begin. The school was among the 200 community day schools President Mahama promised. The late Prof Nana Agyakwa Frimpong III, the then Fodoa chief expressed much satisfaction to the government for such a project to be established on his land.
Nananom poured libation, prayed to the almighty God and the gods of the land to deal with every impediment during the period. The project was finally completed in 2016 and commissioned by President Mahama on 26 October 2016.

Academic programs 

The school runs six (6) Academic programs that is General Science, Agricultural Science, Business, General Arts (4 streams) and Vocational (Home Economics and Visual Arts)

Discipline 
No major disciplinary matters have been recorded in the school. However, minor disciplinary issues were treated with dispatch by the disciplinary committee and culprits were appropriately punished according to the school's rules. A research conducted by Richard Ayertey Lawer on the perception of teachers and students on caning using the school as a case study showed that both teachers and students see caning as an effective tool for correcting students’ misbehavior.

Headmasters/Headmistresses

Achievements 

Sports: The school's performance at inter school sports competition is superb. Fodoa SHS as young as its school is, was able to eliminate the almighty Nkwatia Presbyterian Senior High (Nkwasco) from the 2019 academic year football competition and went ahead to beat St. Peters on their home grounds.
Inter School March pass Competition: For the three years of its existence, the school has, on three consecutive times, emerged winners of the Inter-school Independence Day Match Pass Competition, organized by the Municipal Assembly and the Education Directorate.

References 

Schools in Ghana